Siedlce is a town in Masovian Voivodeship in east-central Poland.

Siedlce may also refer to:

Siedlce, Gdańsk
Siedlce, Lesser Poland Voivodeship (south Poland)
Siedlce, Łódź Voivodeship (central Poland)
Siedlce, Lubin County in Lower Silesian Voivodeship (south-west Poland)
Siedlce, Oława County in Lower Silesian Voivodeship (south-west Poland)
Siedlce, Świętokrzyskie Voivodeship (south-central Poland)